The Deer Park Football Club is an Australian rules football club competing in the Essendon District Football League as of December 2022. It previously competed in the Western Region Football League (WRFL) since 1935. It is based in the Melbourne suburb of Deer Park.

History
When Deer Park was formed in 1925 it spent several years playing in competitions centered on Werribee. In 1935 it entered the FDFL and changed its name. This club was known as ICI after the large chemical firm that operated in the area. After World War II it reformed as Deer Park.

Premierships
 Western Region Football League
Division One (11): 1939, 1940, 1941, 1990, 2013, 2014, 2015, 2016, 2017, 2018, 2019
 Division Two (2): 2009, 2011

Bibliography
 History of the WRFL/FDFL by Kevin Hillier – 
 History of football in Melbourne's north west by John Stoward –

References

External links
Official website

Australian rules football clubs in Melbourne
Australian rules football clubs established in 1925
1925 establishments in Australia
Western Region Football League clubs
Sport in the City of Brimbank